The album Black Book is the soundtrack of the film Black Book (2006). The album was supposed to be released on 29 September 2006 by Warner, but this was rescheduled. The first release was on 2 October 2006 by Milan Records.

The album contains 23 tracks. The first four tracks, songs from the 1930s and 1940s, are sung by actress Carice van Houten. In the film Black Book she plays Rachel Stein, a singer from Berlin. The first of these four songs is in English and the other three are in German. The other 19 tracks on the album are written by Anne Dudley. The music is arranged and conducted by Anne Dudley. The album is produced by Roger Dudley.

Track listing

References

2006 soundtrack albums
Drama film soundtracks